Sir John Bedford Burman, JP 6 October 1867 – 4 March 1941) was Conservative MP for Birmingham Duddeston.

A sometime journalist, he was elected in 1923, re-elected in 1924, but lost the seat to Labour in 1929. He was then Lord Mayor of Birmingham from 1931 to 1932. He received a knighthood in the Birthday Honours for 1936.

His son, John Charles Burman, was Lord Mayor of Birmingham from 1947 to 1949.

References

Craig, F.W.S. British Parliamentary Election Results 1918-1945
Whitaker's Almanack, 1924 to 1931 editions

References 

 

Conservative Party (UK) MPs for English constituencies
Lord Mayors of Birmingham, West Midlands
1867 births
1941 deaths
British newspaper journalists
Knights Bachelor
English justices of the peace